Garrett Wilson (born March 16, 1991) is a Canadian professional ice hockey winger who is currently playing with the Lehigh Valley Phantoms of the American Hockey League (AHL). Wilson was selected by the Florida Panthers in the 4th round (107th overall) of the 2009 NHL Entry Draft.

Playing career
Wilson played major junior hockey in the Ontario Hockey League, and competed for the 2011 Memorial Cup as a member of the Owen Sound Attack. His outstanding play during the 2010–11 OHL season was recognized when he was named to the OHL First All-Star Team.

On June 1, 2011, the Florida Panthers of the National Hockey League signed Wilson to an entry level contract.

In the 2015–16 season, Wilson split the year between the Panthers and AHL affiliate, the Portland Pirates. Wilson was scoreless in a career-best 29 games with Florida. He registered his first NHL point in the post-season, assisting Alex Petrovic's game-winning goal in Game 4 against the New York Islanders.

At the conclusion of the season, Wilson was not offered a contract to remain with the Panthers. On July 7, 2016, he signed as a free agent to a one-year, two-way contract with the Stanley Cup champions, the Pittsburgh Penguins. Wilson joined the Penguins AHL affiliate, the Wilkes-Barre/Scranton Penguins, where he was named an alternate captain. He re-signed with the Penguins on July 1, 2017.

Wilson began the 2018–19 season in the AHL where he was named the captain of the Wilkes-Barre/Scranton Penguins. He was recalled to the Penguins on November 6 but after going pointless in four games he was assigned to Wilkes-Barre/Scranton. Wilson scored his first NHL career goal on February 9, 2019 against the Tampa Bay Lightning.

As a free agent from the Penguins, Wilson agreed to a one-year, $725,000 contract with the Toronto Maple Leafs on July 23, 2019. After attending the Maple Leafs 2019 training camp, Wilson was re-assigned for the duration of the 2019–20 season, to play in the AHL with the Toronto Marlies. 

As a free agent heading into the pandemic delayed 2020–21 season, Wilson was signed to a one-year AHL contract with the Lehigh Valley Phantoms, affiliate to the Philadelphia Flyers, on January 26, 2021.

Career statistics

Awards and honours

References

External links
 

1991 births
Living people
Canadian ice hockey left wingers
Cincinnati Cyclones (ECHL) players
Florida Panthers draft picks
Florida Panthers players
Ice hockey people from Ontario
Lehigh Valley Phantoms players
Owen Sound Attack players
Pittsburgh Penguins players
Portland Pirates players
San Antonio Rampage players
Sportspeople from Barrie
Toronto Marlies players
Windsor Spitfires players
Wilkes-Barre/Scranton Penguins players